Lost Souls Like Us is Benjy Davis Project's fourth studio album, released on March 2, 2010. It was recorded at Rivergate Studios in Hendersonville, TN. The album featured the current band line-up of Benjy Davis and Mic Capdevielle. In addition to Davis and Capdevielle, the album featured a cast of seasoned studio musicians: Mark "Sparky" Matejka of Lynyrd Skynyrd, Danny Chauncey of 38 Special and Jason "Slim" Gambill of Lady Antebellum all contributed guitar parts; Ethan Pilzer (Jewel, Big & Rich) played bass; Jason Spiewak and Bobby Capps played piano and organ; and Sara Jean Kelley sang background vocals.

Track listing
All songs composed by Benjy Davis.

 "Mississippi" - 3:46
 "Get High" - 3:06
 "Give It A Week's Time" - 2:40
 "Stay With Me" - 3:16
 "Send Your Love Down" - 2:56
 "Slow Wind" - 2:55
 "Check Your Pockets" - 4:10
 "Bite My Tongue" - 3:08
 "Iron Chair" - 2:59
 "Aftermath" - 2:56
 "Light Of Other Days" - 3:02
 "You Just Know" - 3:33
 "Sincerely" - 3:47 (Bonus Track, Amazon MP3 only)

Personnel
 Benjy Davis - Acoustic Guitar, Lead Vocals
 Mic Capdevielle - Drums, Percussion

Additional personnel
 Bobby Capps - Hammond B-3 Organ, Background Vocals
 Jason "Slim" Gambill - Mandolin, Electric Guitar
 Mark "Sparky" Matejka - Electric Guitar, Slide Guitar
 Ethan Pilzer - Bass Guitar
 Jason Spiewak - Piano, Hammond B-3 Organ, Background Vocals
 Sara Jean Kelley - Background Vocals
 Danny Chauncey - Guitar

Benjy Davis Project albums
2010 albums